Ben Larson (born ) is an American former college basketball player. A native of Elkhart, Indiana, Larson played NCAA Division I basketball at California Polytechnic State University, San Luis Obispo (Cal Poly) from 1995 to 1999, where as a true freshman he was named the American West Conference Player of the Year. The 1995–96 season saw him average career highs of 12.8 points, 5.2 assists, 3.4 steals, and 2.7 rebounds per game. He led the American West in assists and steals per game in guiding the Mustangs to win the regular season championship. Despite being named as the league's player and freshman of the year, Larson was not named to an all-conference squad.

After Larson's freshman season, the American West Conference disbanded. Cal Poly joined the Big West Conference. In each of his final three seasons, Larson declined his scoring averages down to 11.0, 7.2, and 5.0 points, respectively. He did not attain the same overall impact he did in his freshman year and then went unselected in the 1999 NBA draft. Larson never played professional basketball.

College statistics

|-
| style="text-align:left;"| 1995–96
| style="text-align:left;"| Cal Poly
| 29 || 29 || 36.3 || .379 || .382 || .709 || 2.7 || 5.2 || 3.4 || 0.1 || 12.8
|-
| style="text-align:left;"| 1996–97
| style="text-align:left;"| Cal Poly
| 30 ||  || 30.2 || .395 || .333 || .870 || 2.7 || 3.5 || 2.3 || 0.3 || 11.0
|-
| style="text-align:left;"| 1997–98
| style="text-align:left;"| Cal Poly
| 26 ||  || 31.5 || .360 || .333 || .726 || 2.7 || 4.9 || 2.1 || 0.3 || 7.2
|-
| style="text-align:left;"| 1998–99
| style="text-align:left;"| Cal Poly
| 22 ||  ||   || .353 || .321 || .650 || 2.0 || 4.5 || 2.3 || 0.0 || 5.0
|-
|- class="sortbottom"
| style="text-align:center;" colspan="2"| Career
| 107 ||   ||   || .377 || .351 || .761 || 2.6 || 4.5 || 2.6 || 0.2 || 9.4

See also
 Sean (Allen) McCaw – the only other American West Conference Player of the Year (1995)

References

External links
College statistics @ sports-reference.com

1970s births
Living people
American men's basketball players
Basketball players from Indiana
Cal Poly Mustangs men's basketball players
People from Elkhart, Indiana
Point guards